Onut may refer to:

Güven Önüt, Turkish footballer
Bogdan Onuț, Romanian footballer
Onut, village in Chernivtsi Oblast, Ukraine

Turkish-language surnames